Zanthoxylum kauaense, commonly known as ae or Kauai pricklyash, is a species of flowering plant in the family Rutaceae, that is endemic to Hawaii. It is threatened by habitat loss.

References

kauaense
Endemic flora of Hawaii
Trees of Hawaii
Near threatened plants
Taxonomy articles created by Polbot